Arcade Assogba, is a Beninese filmmaker. He has contributed vastly to the cinema of Benin by making several workshops for digital communication for various major cultural events in Benin such as International Film Festival of Ouidah and the Benin International Theater Festival, Fitheb. He is also notable as the director critically acclaimed short film, ZanKlan.

Personal life
From 2006 to 2009, Assogba studied cinema at the Institut Cinématographique de Ouidah (ICO). Then he obtained a master's degree in human and social sciences from Paris 1 Pantheon Sorbonne University and his master's degree in Law from the University of Abomey-Calavi in Benin.

Career
Assogba started cinema career as a first assistant director on several feature films shot in Benin. He collaborated with renowned international directors such as Sylvestre Amoussou, Jean Odoutan, Pablo César and Heidi Specogna and Pascale Obolo in several documentary films. In 2018, he made his directorial debut with the documentary Crossing.... After the success of the film, he made the Short ZanKlan in the same year. The short received positive reviews from critics and screened and won awards at several film festivals. In 2019, the film won 2nd best prize at Rebiap festival international de films, Benin.

Filmography

See also
 Festival de Baía das Gatas

References

External links
 

Living people
Beninese film directors
Year of birth missing (living people)